Stanley Allen Levenson (6 February 1938 – 8 January 2016) was a Canadian sprinter. He competed in the men's 100 metres at the 1956 Summer Olympics.

He won the 100 m sprint at the 1961 Maccabiah Games in Israel.

References

External links
 

1938 births
2016 deaths
Athletes from Toronto
Athletes (track and field) at the 1956 Summer Olympics
Canadian male sprinters
Olympic track and field athletes of Canada
Athletes (track and field) at the 1958 British Empire and Commonwealth Games
Commonwealth Games competitors for Canada
Maccabiah Games gold medalists for Canada
Maccabiah Games medalists in athletics
Competitors at the 1961 Maccabiah Games